Hospital for Special Surgery (HSS) is a hospital in New York City that specializes in orthopedic surgery and the treatment of rheumatologic conditions.

Founded in 1863 by James Knight, HSS is the oldest orthopedic hospital in the United States and is consistently ranked as the top orthopedic hospital in the United States. Currently, HSS is ranked #1 in orthopedics, #3 in rheumatology and #22 in pediatric orthopedics by U.S. News & World Report. Bryan Kelly serves as the medical director and surgeon-in-chief, and Louis Shapiro serves as its president and chief executive officer.

Areas of expertise at HSS include joint replacement, orthopedic trauma, hand and upper extremity surgery, limb lengthening, foot and ankle surgery, pediatric orthopedics, spine surgery and sports medicine. The hospital performs the most knee replacement surgeries of any hospital in the United States. Trauma surgeons treat fractures and other acute injuries at HSS and work within an Orthopedic Trauma Service that also provides coverage at NewYork-Presbyterian Hospital Weill Cornell Medical Center. HSS physicians with a subspecialty training in the field of spine surgery focus on patients who suffer from congenital or acute spinal disorders as well as from chronic back pain. The sports medicine services at HSS treat athletic injuries of the musculoskeletal system with a special focus on shoulder, elbow, and knee injuries. In addition, orthopedic surgeons at HSS perform limb lengthening, a procedure that uses the body's capacity to create new bone as well as the soft tissues, ligaments, blood vessels, and nerves that surround and support it.

HSS also offers professional medical education programs, including continuing medical education lecture series, conferences and symposia.  Services are available in person at the New York facility and remotely worldwide through the Grand Rounds partnership "eConsult" platform. The hospital has 327 active medical staff.

History 

HSS was incorporated March 27, 1863, as the Society for the Relief of the Ruptured and Crippled. Dr. James Knight, one of the founders, was appointed Resident Physician and Surgeon. He leased his home, at 97 Second Avenue, just south of Sixth Street, to the society for three years, after which the society purchased it. The hospital opened its doors to the first patient, a four-year-old boy with paralysis, on May 1, 1863. There were 28 beds available, all for children. Adults were treated as outpatients.  The poor were treated for free, and the rest at moderate charge.

A 200-bed hospital was built on the northwest corner of Lexington Avenue and 42nd Street (Manhattan), opening May 1, 1870. The building had a fire-proof staircase and an elevator run by a steam-engine. There was no operating room until 1888 after a hospital fire. At the turn of the century, it became the target for efforts to expand Grand Central Terminal and negotiations were led by Cornelius Vanderbilt, II, a member of the Board of Managers of the hospital. In 1912, the hospital moved to a six-story building on 42nd Street between First Avenue and Second Avenue, a site that is now the home of the Ford Foundation. The hospital moved to its present location in 1955.

About

Research 

Current clinical trials focus on issues related to lupus and arthritis. In addition to clinical trials, HSS has several research programs that center on the prevention of musculoskeletal diseases. Basic and applied research conducted at the hospital addresses specific problems such as arthritis, injury, osteoporosis, scoliosis, autoimmune diseases such as lupus, and related musculoskeletal diseases as they affect children and adults.

Affiliations 

The Hospital for Special Surgery is affiliated with the NewYork-Presbyterian Healthcare System through the hospital's affiliation with Weill Cornell Medical College. The hospital is also affiliated with Memorial Sloan-Kettering Cancer Center, and Rockefeller University.

Facilities 

Located on the Upper East Side of Manhattan, HSS is built over the Franklin D. Roosevelt (FDR) drive and partially located in the Belaire building at 535 East 70th Street. Currently HSS has 205 beds and 29 operating rooms.

HSS has several specialized centers that focus on specific patients and joint problems, including:
 Institute for Cartilage Repair
 Children and Adolescent Hand and Arm (CHArm) Center
 Foster Center for Clinical Outcome Research
 Computer Assisted Surgery (CAS) Center
 Center for Hip Pain and Preservation
 Gosden Robinson Inflammatory Arthritis Center
 Integrative Care Center - Combining traditional medicine (Physiatry, with inter alia Chiropractic and Acupuncture)
 Institute for Limb Lengthening and Complex Reconstruction
 Mary Kirkland Center for Lupus Care 
 Mary Kirkland Center for Lupus Research
 Musculoskeletal Magnetic Resonance Imaging Center
 The Center for Musculoskeletal Ultrasound and Nuclear Medicine
 Orthopedic Trauma Service
 Osteoporosis Prevention Center
 The Kathryn O. and Alan C. Greenberg Center for Skeletal Dysplasias
 Spine Care Institute 
 Barbara Volcker Center for Women and Rheumatic Disease
 Women's Sports Medicine Center

Notable alumni
Notable alumni include: 
Oheneba Boachie-Adjei, M.D., attending orthopaedic surgeon, HSS
John Robert Cobb, known for the Cobb angle, head of the Margaret Caspary scoliosis clinic, HSS
John Insall, M.D., attending orthopedic surgeon, HSS
David B. Levine, M.D., director of the Department of Orthopedic Surgery, HSS
Paula J. Olsiewski, founder and director, Technology Development Office, HSS
Leon Root, M.D., chief of pediatric orthopedics, HSS
Francisco Valero-Cuevas, assistant scientist (biomechanical engineer), HSS
Philip D. Wilson Jr., M.D., surgeon-in-chief 1972-1989

Surgeons-in-chief
1863 - James A. Knight
1887 - Virgil P. Gibney
1925 - William Bradley Coley
1933 - Eugene H. Pool
1935 - Philip D. Wilson
1955 - T. Campbell Thompson
1963 - Robert Lee Patterson, Jr.
1972 - Philip D. Wilson Jr.
1990 - Andrew J. Weiland
1993 - Russell F. Warren
2003 - Thomas P. Sculco
2014 - Todd J. Albert
2019 - Bryan T. Kelly

Physicians-in-chief
1924 - R. Garfield Snyder
1944 - Richard Freyberg
1970 - Charles L. Christian
1995 - Stephen A. Paget
2010 - Mary K. Crow
2020 - S. Louis Bridges, Jr.

References

External links 
 
 
 
 
 

Hospital buildings completed in 1870
Hospitals in Manhattan
Teaching hospitals in New York City
NewYork–Presbyterian Healthcare System
Hospitals established in 1883